Sikjangsan is a mountain located in Dong-gu, Daejeon, South Korea.

See also
Geography of Korea
List of mountains in Korea
List of mountains by elevation
Mountain portal
South Korea portal

References

Dong District, Daejeon
Mountains of Daejeon
uwuwuwuwuwuwuuuwwuwuw :>